Rodrigo Leão (born ) is a Brazilian indoor volleyball player. He is a current member of the Brazil men's national volleyball team.

Career
He participated at the 2017 FIVB Volleyball Men’s U23 World Championship, 2017 FIVB Volleyball World League and 2019 FIVB Volleyball Men's Nations League.

Sporting achievements

Clubs
 2014–2015  Brazilian Superliga – with Sada Cruzeiro
 2015–2016  Brazilian Superliga – with Sada Cruzeiro
 2016–2017  Brazilian Superliga – with Sada Cruzeiro
 2017–2018  Brazilian Superliga – with Sada Cruzeiro

South American Club Championship
  2015 – with Sada Cruzeiro
  2016 – with Sada Cruzeiro
  2017 – with Sada Cruzeiro
  2018 – with Sada Cruzeiro
  2019 – with Sada Cruzeiro
  2021 – with Sada Cruzeiro

FIVB Club World Championship
  2015 – with Sada Cruzeiro
  2016 – with Sada Cruzeiro
  2017 – with Sada Cruzeiro
  2022 – with Sada Cruzeiro

National team
 2017  FIVB World League
 2017  South American Championship
 2017  FIVB World Grand Champions Cup
 2019  Pan American Games
 2022  FIVB World Championship

Individuals

 2015 U21 Pan-American Cup – Best Server
 2016 U23 South American Championship – Best Outside Spiker
 2017 South American Club Championship – Best Outside Spiker
 2019 South American Club Championship – Best Outside Spiker

References

External links
 FIVB Biography

1996 births
Living people
Brazilian men's volleyball players
Place of birth missing (living people)
Pan American Games medalists in volleyball
Pan American Games bronze medalists for Brazil
Volleyball players at the 2019 Pan American Games
Medalists at the 2019 Pan American Games
Volleyball players from Rio de Janeiro (city)